Ron Barrett is an American illustrator, best known for illustrating the children's book Cloudy with a Chance of Meatballs, which was written by his former wife, Judi Barrett.

Career
He is a graduate of the School of Industrial Art in New York City. While still in high school, he was an apprentice in the studio of Lucian Bernhard, the great German graphic designer. He also found a mentor in Ervine Metzl, illustrator and President of the Society of Illustrators, who predicted that the young Mr. Barrett "...would either wind up in a mental institution or make a million dollars."
 
After early success as an art director at Young & Rubicam and Carl Ally, winning the Gold Medal of the Art Directors Club of New York, he left advertising to become an illustrator, author and puzzle maker. He wrote The Nutty News and has illustrated many books, such as a series of children's books with Judi Barrett, including Cloudy with a Chance of Meatballs and Animals Should Definitely Not Wear Clothing. He has also worked on several books for adults, including the best-selling O. J.'s Legal Pad with Henry Beard and John Boswell. In 2009 Cloudy With a Chance of Meatballs became an animated feature in 3D, created by Sony Pictures Animation.

During the 1970s, Barrett had many comic strips in the National Lampoon "Funny Pages", of which the best remembered is perhaps "Politenessman".  He became the magazine's art director, giving it a style described as "crisp" and "smart".

Books
Animals Should Definitely Not Act Like People, 1988 hardcover reissue, Aladdin (Illustrator, with Judi Barrett)
Animals Should Definitely Not Wear Clothing, 1988, Aladdin (Illustrator, with Judi Barrett)
Cloudy With a Chance of Meatballs, 1978, Aladdin (Illustrator, with Judi Barrett)
Old Macdonald had some flats, 1969, Longman group limited (Illustrator, with Judith Barrett)
The Nutty News, 2005 hardcover reissue, Knopf,
Pickles to Pittsburgh: The Sequel to Cloudy with a Chance of Meatballs, 1997, Alladin (Illustrator, with Judi Barrett)

References

External links

 

Year of birth missing (living people)
Living people
Puzzle designers
American illustrators
Writers who illustrated their own writing
American comics artists
High School of Art and Design alumni